Mirjana "Mia" Borisavljević (born 8 June 1984) is a Serbian pop-folk singer and television personality from Valjevo. Started performing professionally at seventeen years of age, her debut studio album was released in 2008 under Grand Production. Over the years, Mia has released two more albums, Moj Beograde (2013) and Jedna ja (2019), as well as several standalone singles.

Additionally, she competed on the reality television show Veliki Brat All Stars (2009) and served as a co-host on the singing competition Pinkove Zvezde (2016).

Borisavljević married fellow singer Bojan Grujić in July 2022. The couple has two daughters, born in March 2018 and July 2021.

Discography 
Studio albums
 Mia (2008)
 Moj Beograde (2013)
 Jedna ja (2019)

Filmography

References

External links
 

1984 births
Living people
Musicians from Valjevo
Serbian folk-pop singers
Serbian turbo-folk singers
Grand Production artists
21st-century Serbian women singers